D'Oppido is an Italian surname. Notable people with the surname include:

 Antonio D'Oppido (born 1944), Italian swimmer
 Michele D'Oppido (born 1949), Italian swimmer, brother of Antonio

Italian-language surnames